The term Steaua fans refers to all people who support Steaua Bucuresti, a Romanian sports club with several departments and a Romanian football club respectively.

As Steaua is, judging by performances, the most successful Romanian football team, they enjoy the biggest support among Romanian football fans. A survey conducted in 2004 suggested that the Ghencea-based team accounts for approximately 42% of all Romanian football lovers, meaning about five million fans inside and outside Romania's borders. This large number of supporters is in large part to the club's outstanding performances, both domestically and internationally.
After FCSB lost the name and the crest, the fans have divided into two groups, some fans support CSA Steaua Bucuresti rather than  FC FCSB (the team recognized by FRF to be the original team), while other prominent groups remain undecided over the issue.

History

The Old Days (1947–1995) 
However, at the beginning, being the club of the Romanian Army, Steaua drew its supporters mostly from people linked with the Army. The first waves of new fans came at the beginning of the 1950s, when CCA's legendary golden team won the hearts of many people delighted by their spectacular play.

It was not until 1974 with the erection of Stadionul Ghencea in south-western Bucharest that the Steaua zones of supporters came to standardize themselves in the regions adjacent to the arena, subsequently covering the whole southern half of Bucharest, a city geographically divided by the Dâmbovița River.

1986 is the year when Steaua began to become the most beloved club in the country. The extraordinary success in the European Cup of a fantastic team that was to remain among Europe's finest for another three years turned everyone's attention to the red and blues. Steaua is leader in fan support with 42% population of country.

Armata Ultra' (1995–2001) 
The Steaua Ultras movement began on 4 December 1995, when the bases of Armata Ultra (AU), the first Ultras group in Bucharest (and the second in Romania), were set. For years, AU dominated the Ultra movement in Romania. It quickly reached an impressive number of 4,000 members, a record which stands up to this day for supporter groups in the country. Basically they adopted a far-right Steaua ideology with very strict internal rules, both inside and outside matches, such as no smoking, no eating, no drinking, no sitting, only standing and chanting. They stood out by their high number of membres, the big crowds dispatched to away games, chant power and trouble making, as AU had important hooligan influences. Many saw the disappearance of AU as something like the death of a legend. This occurred in 2001, due to internal problems, when smaller groups appeared, such as Gruppo Apparte and Brigada XXL which, in some manner, identified themselves with AU and gradually messed with their policy, style and way of life. These intrusions culminated with a conflict of their leader, Jean Pavel, with the Steaua Board of Administration. Even though extinct, Armata Ultra's spirit still lives on in most Steaua fans and a great lot of them still identify themselves with AU, as it probably was the strongest, most important ever Ultra group in Romania.

Peluza Nord and Peluza Sud Era (2001–2014) 
From around 2001 to 2014, Steaua's supporters were not led by a single group. The tendency was to form several small groups who played their own part. The most important part of them were located in the Peluza Nord (North End), some others taking their place in the Peluza Sud (South End). Because of different attitudes towards the team and the game (PS were usually tougher and more severe in which regards the game and often not so patient), there were sometimes conflicts between how the team should be supported. The groups at the PS (Ultras, Glas, Vacarm, Stil Ostil, Banda Ultra, South Boys, Era, Outlaws, Hunters, RoosterS', Tineretului Korp, Shadows 08) even officially ceased activity for a while because of conflicts like these with the more numerous PN. Groups inside Peluza Nord included, Titan Boys, Nucleo, Gruppo Tei, Skins Berceni, Insurgenții, Armata 47, Ultras Colentina, Gruppo Voluntari Est.

It was rather difficult to assign Steaua's Peluza Nord and Peluza Sud fans a certain style. They could have been described by the typical Italian style, common in various respects to all Romanian groups of fans, with many choreographies, banners, flags, doubleholders and flags swinging in the air but on the other hand still had serious Hooligan influences existent from the defunct Armata Ultra' era. Therefore, they mostly resembled the western European style, typical for fans such as those of AFC Ajax, Paris Saint-Germain FC, BV Borussia Dortmund, etc.

Since Steaua were dropped to the 4th division in 2016, both Peluza Sud and Peluza Nord attend matches at Ghencea training ground and away fixtures, however most groups from Peluza Nord disbanded and those remaining joined Peluza Sud to form a united Peluza.

As soon as the leader of the Skins Berceni group left prison, some fans of Peluza Nord returned to support the team in Liga I, FCSB. So far the groups are: Insurgentii Colentina 1998, Skins Berceni 1996, Titan Boys 1996 and North boys 2022

AISS 

More recently, as up 2006, the supporters have formed their own official supporters' association, following the example of most European clubs. Asociația Independentă a Suporterilor Steliști (AISS; Steaua Supporters' Independent Association) was formed as a legal entity with its stated goals of 'protecting the interests and image of Steaua supporters', as well as 'identifying and promoting the club's perennial values'.

Gradually aiming for multiplying its members, AISS has involved itself so far in several actions as celebrating the club's 60 years of existence and a general campaign to protect the club's image against a certain negative influence of main investor George Becali over its historical tradition and values.

Fans outside Romania 
There are also groups of Steaua fans outside Romania, for example the SUD 2009, a group of German Steaua fans, "GRUPPO CHISINAU" and Steaua Fan Club UK .

Racism 
The issue has lately generated several incidents and fights between factions of supporters of Steaua and Rapid, some of them causing pitch suspensions and even being minutes away from provoking match suspensions.

Stadionul Ghencea has been targeted by UEFA in 2005, as a result of certain racist behaviours of some of the fans during a UEFA Champions League qualifying match against Shelbourne FC. The pitch was suspended for one match.

Pitch suspensions have actually been the key-word for Steaua and its fans during the last three seasons, as no more than 10 Liga I matchday suspensions (with one more to go in the next season) and one in the UEFA Cup have been dictated and cumulated against and by the Ghencea-based club.

Friendships and influence 
As Steaua is the most popular club in Romania, there are, besides Bucharest, several cities counting a great majority of red and blue supporters among football lovers. Widely speaking, these cities are predominant in the Eastern half of the country, particularly in the regions of Moldavia, Greater Wallachia and Northern Dobruja. Cities such as Suceava, Piatra Neamț, Bacău, Galați (inside Moldavia), Constanța (Northern Dobruja), Buzău, Brăila, Târgoviște, Călărași (Greater Wallachia), Râmnicu Vâlcea, Târgu Jiu (Oltenia), Brașov, Oradea, Sibiu, Târgu Mureș or Petroșani (Transylvania) enjoy a great majority of Steaua fans which are often well-received even by fans of the local teams.

The club is also popular outside the borders, notably between Romanian emigrants. The Valencian Community in Spain accounts for an important number of supporters, being the most important area for this matter.

Steaua fans are also maintaining good relations with the fans of CSKA Sofia of Bulgaria, with whom they share the common root of once representing the teams of their national armies. The bases of these relations date from a UEFA Cup encounter in 2004 between the two clubs. Some ultras are also friends with the ultras from UTA Arad, Corvinul Hunedoara, Farul Constanța, NEC Nijmegen, PAOK FC, CSKA Moscow and Partizan Belgrade. Also, European encounters against Panathinaikos in 1998 and Slavia Praha in 1999 were premises for setting contacts with rival fans of Olympiacos of Greece and Sparta Prague of Czech Republic respectively.

Rivalries

Rivalry with Dinamo 

Steaua against FC Dinamo București has been the leading Romanian football derby in the last 60 years, as Steaua and Dinamo are the two most successful football teams in the country. It has also been and still is a match between the former clubs of the Romanian Army (Steaua) and the Ministry of Internal Affairs (Dinamo). Not once have there been famous clashes between different factions of supporters of them, in the streets as well as inside the stadium. The heyday was reached before a match kick-off in 1997, when Dinamo fans set a sector of Ghencea Stadium's South End (where they were assigned) on fire. Between October 1991 and April 2000, Steaua enjoyed their moment of glory, counting 19 undefeated official matches in front of their rivals, both in the championship and the cup.

Rivalry with Dinamo also extends to other sports such as handball, rugby union and water polo.

Rivalry with Rapid 
The second rivalry is with FC Rapid București. Several matches in the last years between Steaua and Rapid have ended in serious clashes between fans. Rivalry has become even fiercer since Steaua outpassed Rapid in an all-Romanian UEFA Cup quarter final in 2006.

Other rivalries 
Milder and historical rivalries are also with non-Bucharest teams such as Universitatea Craiova, Politehnica Timișoara, CFR Cluj, Universitatea Cluj and Petrolul Ploiești.

Notable is also a non-football rivalry with SC Miercurea Ciuc, Steaua's biggest rival inside the national ice hockey competition. Besides the sporting rivalry, this dispute also stems from at ethnic issue, as SC Miercurea Ciuc represents the former Hungarian Autonomous Province, whose inhabitants, mainly Hungarian, are seen as separatists.

Famous Steaua Bucharest fans 
  Mihai Alexandru, composer and producer.
  Andrei Stoica, kickboxer.
  Crin Antonescu, politician.
 Victor Ponta, politician and jurist, current Prime Minister of Romania.
  Alexandru Arșinel, comedian and actor.
  Dan Bittman, singer who represented the country at the Eurovision Song Contest 1994.
  Alina Dumitru, judoka who was one-time Olympic champion and eight-time European champion.
  Alina Plugaru, actress.
  Felicia Filip, operatic soprano.
  Mihai Găinușă, radio and TV star.
  Mihai Georgescu, singer and lead vocalist.
  Dinu Maxer, singer.
  Guess Who, hip hop singer.
  Victor Hănescu, tennis player.
  Horia Moculescu, pianist, composer and producer.
  Ilie Năstase, former professional tennis player, was the World No. 1.
  Cristina Neagu, handball player who was voted World Handball Player of the Year 2010.
  Cornel Palade, actor.
  Viorel Hrebenciuc, statistician and politician.
  Leonard Dorin Doroftei, former boxer, WBA Lightweight World Champion and two-times Olympic medalist.
  George Mihăiţă, actor.
  Victor Rebengiuc, actor.
  Corneliu Vadim Tudor, politician.
  Lucian Viziru, actor and singer.
  Dragoş "Caddillac" Vlad-Neagu, hip-hop and singer.
  Mădălin Voicu, musician and politician.
   Sergiu Nicolaescu, renowned film director and actor.
  Ovi Martin, singer, producer and musician, who represented the country at the Eurovision Song Contest 2010, finishing 3rd.
   Paula Seling, singer who represented the country at the Eurovision Song Contest 2010, finishing 3rd.
  Larry Hagman, world famous film and television actor.
  Pavel Bartoș, actor and television presenter.
  Dan Condurache, actor.

  Leopoldina Bălănuță, actress.

  Simona Halep, female tennis player.
  Mihai "Michi" Câmpineanu, music composer at Şuie Paparude.
  Mihai Constantinescu, former musician.

References 

fans
fans
Association football supporters